WMMH (91.9 FM) is a radio station broadcasting a Religious (Catholic) format licensed to Houtzdale, Pennsylvania, United States. The station serves the Altoona, Pennsylvania area, and is owned by J.M.J. Radio, Inc.

References

External links
WMMH's official website
 

MMH